Gradle is a build automation tool for multi-language software development. It controls the development process in the tasks of compilation and packaging to testing, deployment, and publishing. Supported languages include Java (as well as Kotlin, Groovy, Scala), C/C++, and JavaScript. It also collects statistical data about the usage of software libraries around the globe.

Gradle builds on the concepts of Apache Ant and Apache Maven, and introduces a Groovy- and Kotlin-based domain-specific language contrasted with the XML-based project configuration used by Maven. Gradle uses a directed acyclic graph to determine the order in which tasks can be run, through providing dependency management. It runs on the Java Virtual Machine.

Gradle was designed for multi-project builds, which can grow to be large. It operates based on a series of build tasks that can run serially or in parallel. Incremental builds are supported by determining the parts of the build tree that are already up to date; any task dependent only on those parts does not need to be re-executed. It also supports caching of build components, potentially across a shared network using the Gradle Build Cache. It produces web-based build visualization called Gradle Build Scans. The software is extensible for new features and programming languages with a plugin subsystem.

Gradle is distributed as Free Software under the Apache License 2.0, and was first released in 2008.

History

Origin of the name 
Founder and CEO Hans Dockter has said that he originally wanted to name the project "Cradle". However, to make the name unique and less "diminutive" he instead chose "Gradle", taking the "G" from the use of Groovy.

Major versions

Distribution 
Gradle is available as a separate download, but can also be found bundled in products such as Android Studio.

See also 

 List of build automation software

References

Further reading

External links 
 
 Official Gradle Enterprise website
  With Gradle founder Hans Dockter and Aleksandar Gargenta

Compiling tools
Java development tools
Build automation
Cross-platform software
Software using the Apache license
2007 software